George Columbus Barnhardt (December 28, 1868 – December 10, 1930) was a United States Army officer who served during World War I. He attained the rank of brigadier general, and was best known for his command of 28th Regiment, 2nd Brigade, 178th Brigade, 6th Cavalry Regiment, and 1st Cavalry Division.

Early life 
Barnhardt was born in Gold Hill, North Carolina on December 28, 1868, a son of Marshall Lank Barnhardt and Sarah Pines (Dunlap) Barnhardt. In June 1892, he graduated number seventeen of sixty-two from the United States Military Academy. Several of his fellow classmates included future general officers, such as Charles Pelot Summerall, Tracy Campbell Dickson, Julian Robert Lindsey, William Ruthven Smith, James Ancil Shipton, Louis Chapin Covell, Preston Brown, George Blakely, John M. Palmer, Frank W. Coe, Howard Russell Hickok, Robert Mearns, Henry Howard Whitney, William Chamberlaine, John E. Woodward and Peter Weimer Davison.

Military career 
Barnhardt was commissioned a second lieutenant in the Sixth Cavalry and served at Fort McKinney, New York, from September 30, 1892, to October 2, 1894.

During the Spanish–American War, he commanded a cavalry troop in the Santiago campaign. After the war, he spent two years at Fort Leavenworth, in Kansas and then participated in the China Relief Expedition, followed by four years in the Philippines.

From 1907 to 1909, he was in Cuba and from 1909 to 1912 was adjutant of the 15th Cavalry. Barnhardt then did General Staff duty from 1913 to 1916 and was on the Mexican border. In 1916, he was also serving with the Quartermaster Corps. He commanded the 329th Infantry at Camp Sherman, in Ohio, and was in France with the American Expeditionary Force after the American entry into World War I.

On August 1, 1918, he was promoted to brigadier general of the national army and assigned the 178th Brigade in France and Germany. From 1921 to 1925, after arriving back in the United States, Barnhardt was a General Staff colonel, and from 1925 to 1927 he commanded the Sixth Cavalry. He also commanded the Military District of Washington from July to September 1927, and his last assignment was the command of the 22d Infantry Brigade in Hawaii.

Awards
Barnhardt was awarded the Distinguished Service Medal from the United States, as well as the Croix de Guerre with Palm and the Legion of Honor (Officer) from France. The citation for his Army DSM reads:

Death and legacy
Barnhardt died at Ft. Bliss on December 10, 1930. He was temporarily interred at Concordia Cemetery in El Paso, and permanently interred at West Point Cemetery.

Notes

References

Bibliography
 Cullum, George W. 1891. Biographical register of the officers and graduates of the U.S. military academy at West Point, N.Y. Boston and New York: Houghton, Mifflin and Company. 

1868 births
1930 deaths
Military personnel from North Carolina
United States Military Academy alumni
People from Gold Hill, North Carolina
United States Army generals of World War I
United States Army generals
American military personnel of the Spanish–American War
American people of the Boxer Rebellion
Recipients of the Distinguished Service Medal (US Army)
Recipients of the Croix de Guerre (France)
Officiers of the Légion d'honneur
Burials at West Point Cemetery